Adel and Wharfedale is a ward in the metropolitan borough of the City of Leeds, West Yorkshire, England.  It contains 40 listed buildings that are recorded in the National Heritage List for England.  Of these, one is listed at Grade I, the highest of the three grades, and the others are at Grade II, the lowest grade. The ward is to the north of the centre of Leeds, and contains the areas of Adel and Cookridge, and countryside to the north.  The ward contains St John's Church, which is listed at Grade I, and associated buildings and monuments in the churchyard are listed.   Also in the ward is Lawnswood Cemetery, which contains listed buildings and memorials, including a war memorial.  In the ward is Cookridge Hall, which is listed together with associated structures.  The other listed buildings include houses, farmhouses and farm buildings, two milestones, a public house, and a former reform school.


Key

Buildings

References

Citations

Sources

 

Lists of listed buildings in West Yorkshire